The 2015 Lehigh Valley Steelhawks season was the fifth season for the indoor football franchise, and their third in the Professional Indoor Football League (PIFL).

In 2015, the Steelhawks announced that they would be moving to the newly constructed PPL Center.

Schedule
Key:

Regular season
All start times are local to home team

Standings

Postseason

Roster

References

Lehigh Valley Steelhawks
Lehigh Valley Steelhawks
Lehigh Valley Steelhawks